Sangaris giesberti is a species of beetle in the family Cerambycidae. It was described by Hovore in 1998. It is known from Mexico and Costa Rica.

References

giesberti
Beetles described in 1998